Walter Harris Kinzie (March 16, 1858 – November 5, 1909) was an American professional baseball player who played shortstop in 1882 for the Detroit Wolverines and in 1884 for the Chicago White Stockings and St. Louis Browns.

External links

Baseball players from Kansas
Detroit Wolverines players
Chicago White Stockings players
St. Louis Browns (AA) players
19th-century baseball players
1857 births
1909 deaths
Major League Baseball shortstops
Fort Wayne Hoosiers players
Minneapolis Millers (baseball) players
Oshkosh (minor league baseball) players
Kansas City Cowboys (minor league) players
LaCrosse Freezers players
Burlington Babies players
People from Burlington, Kansas
Chicago Whitings players